Marion Deuchars (born 1964 in Falkirk, Stirlingshire) is a British illustrator and author.

Biography 

Deuchars attended Duncan of Jordanstone College of Art in 1983-1987 where she obtained a first class BA Honours in illustration printmaking. In 1987 she was accepted to the Royal College of Art where she studied communication, art and design. In 1989 she received an MA with distinction. 

Deuchars is best known for her distinct style of using hand lettering, which she first used in a D&AD annual report in 2002. To mark D&AD’s 40th birthday, the Annual Review was called "What’s the point", which was art directed by Vince Frost and all 5496 words of the text was written in pencil by Deuchars. Her distinguishable style has been used on stamps for the Royal Mail to commemorate the Royal Shakespeare Company’s 50th anniversary. Deuchars worked in collaboration with Hat Trick Designs to produce six stamps. Deuchars hand lettering also featured prominently for the British brand Cass Art, appearing in their shop front windows, as well as in Jamie Oliver cookbooks. For the past two year she has provided illustrations to Carluccio’s menus, designed by Irving and Co. Her 2009 book cover for Penguin Books for Burmese Days by George Orwell won the 2010 Book Cover Illustration Award from the V&A. Deuchars worked for several clients including the Guardian newspaper where she was the sole illustrator for the Saturday paper between 2005-2007. She has also made over 100 book cover designs for Editorial Losada publishing in Spain.

In 2012, Deuchars was chosen by the British Council as one of six creatives to represent Britain at the World Design Capital in Helsinki. She has won several awards including a Gold and Silver at the Art Directors Club NY and three D&AD yellow pencils. Deuchars has been a member of AGI since 2000.

Deuchars is the author of a number of bestselling books including her first children's picture book, Bob the Artist, and a series of award-winning art activity books, including, Let’s Make Some Great Art and Let’s Make Great Fingerprint Art, all published by Laurence King Publishing. She has collaborated with Margaret Calvert in an exhibition and publication called If You Could Collaborate, and a campaign inviting renowned designers to reinvent the current "elderly crossing" British roads signs by NB Studio. She became a Royal Designer for Industry in November 2018.  

Deuchars is currently based in a studio in North London. She is married to graphic designer Angus Hyland.

Bibliography

 Let's Make Some Great Art, 2011, published by Laurence King Publishing, 
 Let's Make Some Great Placemat Art, 2012, published by Laurence King Publishing, 
 Let's Make Some Great Fingerprint Art, 2012, published by Laurence King Publishing, 
 Draw Paint Print like the Great Artists, 2014, published by Laurence King Publishing, 
 Bob the Artist, 2016, published by Laurence King Publishing, 
 Art Play, 2016, published by Laurence King Publishing, 
 Colour, 2017, published by Particular Books, 
 Bob's Blue Period, 2018, published by Laurence King Publishing,

References 

1964 births
Living people
Alumni of the Royal College of Art
Alumni of the University of Dundee
People from Falkirk
Scottish illustrators
Scottish women artists
Scottish women writers
Scottish writers